
Gmina Trzcianne is a rural gmina (administrative district) in Mońki County, Podlaskie Voivodeship, in north-eastern Poland.

Villages
Gmina Trzcianne contains the villages and settlements of Boguszewo, Boguszki, Brzeziny, Budy, Chojnowo, Dobarz, Giełczyn, Gugny, Kleszcze, Korczak, Krynica, Laskowiec, Milewo, Mroczki, Niewiarowo, Nowa Wieś, Pisanki, Stare Bajki, Stójka, Szorce, Trzcianne, Wilamówka, Wyszowate, Zajki, Zubole and Zucielec.

Neighbouring gminas
Gmina Trzcianne is bordered by the gminas of Goniądz, Jedwabne, Krypno, Mońki, Radziłów, Tykocin, Wizna and Zawady.

References
 Polish official population figures 2006
 Population. Size and Structure by Territorial Division. As of June 30, 2019. Główny Urząd Statystyczny (GUS) (PDF files; 0.99 MiB), accessed on December 24, 2019

Trzcianne
Mońki County